The Honda Vision is a scooter made by Honda that was introduced in 1985. Variants include the Honda NSC50 (EU) and Honda NSC110 (Worldwide). All versions of the Vision are powered by an air-cooled 49 or 108 cc four-stroke engine coupled to an automatic transmission. They are equipped with 14-inch wheels and Honda's Combined Braking System (CBS).

References 

Vision
Vision
Motorcycles introduced in 2011
Motor scooters